HBA or hba may refer to:

Organizations
 Hawaii Baptist Academy
 Healthcare Businesswomen's Association
 Hewa Bora Airways
 Hirsch Bedner Associates
 Hospital Broadcasting Association

Science and technology
 Hemoglobin A (HbA)
 Host bus adapter, computer network hardware
 Horse blood agar, an agar plate

Other uses
 Hamba language (ISO 639-3 code hba)
 Highway Beautification Act
 Hobart International Airport (IATA code), Tasmania, Australia 
 Honors Bachelor of Arts or Honors Business Administration, abbreviation used in Canada for some honours degrees
 Hood By Air, fashion brand